Charles Keene may refer to:

Charles Keene (artist) (18231891), English artist and illustrator
Charles Keene (archer) (18641926), British Olympic archer
Charles Keene (racing driver), American racing driver
Charles Keene (diplomat), United Kingdom chargé d'affaires to Sweden

See also
 Charles Kean (1811–1868), actor
 Charles Keane (disambiguation)